There have been two Bagot Baronetcies.

Bagot of Blithfield Hall, Staffordshire
The Bagot baronetcy of Blithfield Hall, in the County of Staffordshire was created in the Baronetage of England on 31 May 1627 for  Hervey Bagot. 
 See Baron Bagot.

Bagot of Levens Hall, Westmorland 
Created in the Baronetage of the United Kingdom 19 April 1913.
Sir Alan Desmond Bagot, 1st Baronet (20 February 1896 – 11 January 1920) (extinct on his death)

References

Extinct baronetcies in the Baronetage of the United Kingdom
Baronetcies in the Baronetage of England
1913 establishments in the United Kingdom